Akidini is a tribe of darkling beetles in the subfamily Pimeliinae in the family Tenebrionidae. There are about 5 genera in Akidini, found in the Palearctic.

Genera
These genera belong to the tribe Akidini:
 Akis Herbst, 1799
 Cyphogenia Solier, 1837
 Morica Dejean, 1834
 Sarothropus Kraatz, 1865
 Solskyia Solsky, 1881

References

Further reading

 
 

Tenebrionoidea